Maurizio Centini, O.F.M. Conv. (1592 – 14 November 1639) was a Roman Catholic prelate who served as Bishop of Mileto (1631–1639) 
and Bishop of Massa Lubrense (1626–1631).

Biography
Maurizio Centini was born in 1592 in Ascoli, Italy and ordained a priest in the Order of Friars Minor Conventual.
On 9 February 1626, he was appointed during the papacy of Pope Urban VIII as Bishop of Massa Lubrense. 
In March 1626, he was consecrated bishop by Felice Centini, Bishop of Macerata e Tolentino. On 12 May 1631, he was appointed during the papacy of Pope Urban VIII as Bishop of Mileto. 
He served as Bishop of Mileto until his death on 14 November 1639. 
While bishop, he was the principal co-consecrator of Hector de Monte, Bishop of Termoli (1626).

See also
Catholic Church in Italy

References

External links and additional sources
 (for Chronology of Bishops) 
 (for Chronology of Bishops) 
 (for Chronology of Bishops) 
 (for Chronology of Bishops) 

17th-century Italian Roman Catholic bishops
Bishops appointed by Pope Urban VIII
1592 births
1639 deaths
Conventual Franciscan bishops